Pirana is a small village 8 km north of Tonk city in Tonk district, situated near the base of a hill.

References

History of Rajasthan
Tonk district
Villages in Tonk district